Aravind 2 is a 2013 Indian Telugu-language thriller film directed by Sekhar Suri starring Sri, Maadhavi Latha, Kamal Kamaraju, Srinivas Avasarala and Adonica. It is a sequel to the 2005 movie, A Film by Aravind. G. Phanindra and G. Vijay Choudary produced the film for Sri Vijayabheri Productions while Vijay Kurakula provided the music. It was released on 29 March 2013.

Plot

Cast 
Mangam Srinivas as Aravind
Maadhavi Latha as Priya
Kamal Kamaraju as Rishi
Adonica
Sri Reddy
Srinivas Avasarala as Film director
Banerjee
Surya as Sudarshan, Priya's father
 Pokiri Vijay
 Bala Prasad as Co director

Release and reception 
Aravind 2 was released on 29 March 2013, delayed from 8 February. Pasupulate of The Times of India rated the film two stars out of five, saying, "Being a sequel of the 2006 cult thriller, A Film by Aravind, we can't help but compare it to the original – this one isn't a patch on the original. We're afraid it's all sound – background score, we mean – and no substance". Vishnupriya Bhandaram of The Hindu wrote, "Aravind 2 gives you the promise of a Jason Voorhees (reckon Friday the 13th) but bails on you right in the beginning. It isn't because the storyline isn't strong enough but simply because the filmmakers deem it all right to include crass elements and characters, to give it unnecessary padding". Mahesh S Koneru of 123telugu wrote, "Aravind 2 is a poor excuse of a thriller. A lot of effort went into the making of this movie but all that is wasted because it is badly written, poorly directed and terribly edited".

References

External links 
 
 

2010s Telugu-language films
2013 films
2013 thriller films
Films directed by Sekhar Suri
Indian thriller films